Pascal Richard (born 16 March 1964) is a French-speaking Swiss former racing cyclist. He is most notable as a former King of the Mountains winner at the Giro d'Italia and Olympic Games gold medalist. He won the Swiss National Road Race championship in 1989 and 1993.

Biography
Richard was born in Vevey. At the start of his career, he was a successful cyclo-cross cyclist, becoming world champion in this discipline in 1988. Later on, he switched to road-cycling, and showed a considerable talent for climbing. He won the classics Giro di Lombardia in 1993 and Liège–Bastogne–Liège in 1996. In 1996 he also gained Olympic gold after winning a sprint in a successful three-man breakaway in the men's road race.

He won the "King of the Mountains" jersey in the 1994 Giro d'Italia and Stage 12 of the 1996 Tour de France; he captured the overall titles in the 1994 Tour de Suisse and the 1993 and 1994 Tour de Romandie.

Major results

1985
 1st  Grand Prix Guillaume Tell
1st Stage 7b
1986
 1st  National Cyclo-cross Championships
 1st Stage 5b Vuelta a Asturias
1987 
 3rd Overall Grand Prix Guillaume Tell
1st Stage 1 
1988
 1st  UCI World Cyclo-cross Championships
1989
 1st  Road race, National Road Championships
 1st  National Cyclo-cross Championships
 1st Stage 16 Tour de France
 6th Grand Prix des Amériques
1990
 1st Tre Valli Varesine
 2nd Giro di Lombardia
 2nd Giro del Veneto
 9th Clásica de San Sebastián
1991
 1st Trofeo Laigueglia
 1st Stage 2 Tirreno–Adriatico
 Tour de Romandie
1st Prologue & Stage 6 
 2nd Overall Tour de Suisse
 2nd Tre Valli Varesine
 4th Overall Tour Méditerranéen La Méditerranéenne
 4th Coppa Bernocchi
1993
 1st  Road race, National Road Championships
 1st  Overall Tour de Romandie
1st Stage 3 
 1st Giro di Lombardia
 1st Giro del Lazio
 1st Giro della Romagna
 1st Stage 8 Tour de Suisse
 2nd Giro dell'Emilia
 4th Overall Tour of the Basque Country
 4th Overall Settimana Internazionale di Coppi e Bartali
1st Stage 4 
 4th Grand Prix of Aargau Canton
 5th Overall Critérium International
1st Stage 1 
 8th Giro del Veneto
1994
 1st  Overall Tour de Suisse
1st Stage 3
 1st  Overall Tour de Romandie
 1st Stages 3 & 5 (ITT)
 Giro d'Italia
1st  Mountains classification
1st Stage 21
 1st Grand Prix of Aargau Canton
 1st Tour du Lac Léman
 2nd Giro di Toscana
 2nd Tour de Berne
 3rd Giro di Lombardia
 4th Trofeo Pantalica
 5th Milano–Torino
 7th Overall Paris–Nice
1st Stage 5 
 7th Züri-Metzgete
1995
 Giro d'Italia
1st Stages 13 & 19
 1st Giro del Lazio
 1st Giro della Provincia di Reggio Calabria
 1st Grand Prix of Aargau Canton
 1st Trofeo Melinda
 1st Stage 7 Paris–Nice
 5th Road race, UCI Road World Championships
 8th Giro di Lombardia
1996
 1st  Road race, Olympic Games
 1st Liège–Bastogne–Liège
 1st Stage 12 Tour de France
 1st Stage 14 Giro d'Italia
 2nd Klasika Primavera
 6th Tour de Berne
1998
 3rd Overall À travers Lausanne
 5th Giro di Lombardia
 8th Coppa Ugo Agostoni
 10th Giro del Trentino
1st Stage 4 
1999
 1st Criterium d'Abruzzo
 1st Stage 1 Tour de Suisse
 5th Overall Giro della Provincia di Lucca
 6th Tour de Berne
 7th Coppa Sabatini
2000
 4th Overall Settimana Internazionale di Coppi e Bartali

References

External links 

 

Swiss male cyclists
Swiss Tour de France stage winners
Cyclo-cross cyclists
Olympic cyclists of Switzerland
Olympic gold medalists for Switzerland
Cyclists at the 1996 Summer Olympics
Swiss Giro d'Italia stage winners
1964 births
Living people
People from Vevey
Olympic medalists in cycling
UCI Cyclo-cross World Champions (men)
Tour de Suisse stage winners
Medalists at the 1996 Summer Olympics
Sportspeople from the canton of Vaud